The Salt Lake City Cemetery is a cemetery in northeastern Salt Lake City, Utah, United States, that is one of the largest city-operated cemeteries in the United States.

Description
The cemetery is located above 4th Avenue and east of N Street in The Avenues neighborhood of Salt Lake City. Approximately 120,000 persons are buried in the cemetery. Many religious leaders and politicians, particularly many leaders of the Church of Jesus Christ of Latter-day Saints (LDS Church) lie in the cemetery.

History
The first burial occurred on September 27, 1848, when George Wallace buried his child, Mary Wallace. In 1849, George Wallace, Daniel H. Wells, and Joseph Heywood surveyed  at the same site for the area's burial grounds. In 1851, Salt Lake City was incorporated and the  officially became the Salt Lake City Cemetery with George Wallace as its first sexton.

The cemetery contains one British Commonwealth war grave, of a Canadian Army soldier of World War I.

See also
 List of burials at Salt Lake City Cemetery

Notes

References

Further reading

External links

 
 Cemeteries & Burials, Heritage.utah.gov
 
 Cemeteries and Memorial Sites of Politicians in Salt Lake County, Utah, The Political Graveyard
 
 

1847 establishments in Utah
Buildings and structures in Salt Lake City
Cemeteries in Utah
Historic American Landscapes Survey in Utah